Thompson's Harbor State Park is a remote and largely undeveloped public recreation area on Lake Huron covering  in Presque Isle County, Michigan. The state park's  of pristine shoreline encompass a varying terrain of second growth forest, limestone cobble beaches, and deep sand dunes. The park's flora and fauna include a large population of dwarf lake iris as well as more than one hundred bird species, coyotes, deer, and possibly black bear. The park offers  of trails for hikers and cross-country skiers, rustic cabins, and opportunities for sea kayaking. The park was designated a Michigan "dark sky preserve" in 2016.

Gallery

References

External links
Thompson's Harbor State Park Michigan Department of Natural Resources
Thompson's Harbor State Park Map Michigan Department of Natural Resources

State parks of Michigan
Protected areas of Presque Isle County, Michigan
Protected areas established in 1988
1988 establishments in Michigan
IUCN Category III
Lake Huron